The Nanhai Academy is a collection of cultural and educational facilities located on Nanhai Road in the Zhongzheng District of Taipei, Taiwan.

History
After the Republic of China Government relocated to Taiwan following the Chinese Civil War, President Chiang Kai-shek ordered its construction. The Ministry of Education and Chang Chi-yun planned the construction of five major social institutions located around the Taipei Botanical Garden.  The majority of buildings were originally built during the Japanese occupation of Taiwan and were converted to a traditional Chinese architectural appearance during the 1950s and 1960s.

Campus facilities

Academic institutions

 Original National Taiwan Science Education Center building (currently under renovation)
 National Education Radio
 National Museum of History
 Taipei Municipal Jianguo High School
 Taipei Mandarin Experimental Elementary School
 National Taiwan Arts Education Center building
 Original National Central Library building, now also houses part of the National Taiwan Arts Education Center

Government agencies
 Council of Agriculture
 Chunghwa Postal Museum
 Forestry Museum

Cultural institutions

 Taipei Botanical Garden
 Former residence of Yen Chia-kan
 Former residence of Sun_Yun-suan
 Freedom House
 Harmony House
 Yuyu Yang Museum
 Guling Street Avant-garde Theatre
 Confucius-Mencius Society of the Republic of China

Transportation
The academy is accessible within walking distance East from Wanhua Station of Taiwan Railways.

See also
 Sinicization
 History of the Kuomintang cultural policy
 Chinese Cultural Renaissance
 Chen Daqi

References
 The Research on The Redevelopment Strategy for The Urban Public Deserted Space － A Case Study of Nanhai Cultural Area. Lih-Yau Song. 1995

External links

 National Museum of History
 National Taiwan Art Education Center
 Taipei Botanical Garden
 Yuyu Yang Museum
 Confucius-Mencius Society of the Republic of China

Buildings and structures in Taipei
Education in Taipei
Tourist attractions in Taipei